S. P. Sreekumar is an Indian actor who works in Malayalam cinema and TV series. He was a former contestant of Mammoty the  reality show streamed in Asianet.

His first TV show was Chirikidathom on Amrita TV and later his performance as Lolithan in Marimayam gave him the big break. Within a short span of time Sreekumar has played a variety of roles in the film industry. He played a tribal youth Sankaran, in Papilio Buddha, but in his next outing ABCD: American-Born Confused Desi, he played Lloyd, a typical Kochiite with the local slang, and a serial killer in the film Memories.

Sreekumar says "Acting is my passion and hence I don't mind playing a comic role, a serious one or even a character with grey shades. It all depends on the quality of work, and whatever role I do, I will do it with all sincerity."

He married TV anchor and actress Sneha Sreekumar on 11 December 2019.

Awards
Kerala State Television Awards
 2014  Special Mention - Marimayam

Television

References

External links
 

Indian male television actors
Male actors from Thiruvananthapuram
Living people
Male actors in Malayalam cinema
Indian male film actors
21st-century Indian male actors
Year of birth missing (living people)
Place of birth missing (living people)
Male actors in Malayalam television